Frances is a 1982 American biographical drama film directed by Graeme Clifford from a screenplay written by Eric Bergren, Christopher De Vore, and Nicholas Kazan. The film stars Jessica Lange as Frances Farmer, a troubled actress during the 1930s whose career suffered as a result of her mental illness. It also features Kim Stanley, Sam Shepard, Bart Burns, Christopher Pennock, Jonathan Banks, and Jeffrey DeMunn in supporting roles.

The film chronicles Farmer's life from her days as a high school student, her turbulent relationship with her emotionally abusive mother, her short lived film career in the 1930s, her institutionalization for alleged mental illness in the 1940s, her deinstitutionalization in the 1950s and her appearance on This Is Your Life.

Frances was released theatrically on December 3, 1982 by  Universal Pictures. Lange's performance was unanimously praised and has been cited by many (including her) as her best performance.
At the 55th Academy Awards, it received two nominations for Lange and Stanley as Best Actress and Best Supporting Actress respectively.

Plot
Born in Seattle, Washington, Frances Elena Farmer is a rebel from a young age, winning $100 in 1931 from The Scholastic Art and Writing Awards for a high school essay called God Dies. In 1935, she becomes controversial again when she wins (and accepts) an all-expenses-paid trip to the USSR to visit its Moscow Art Theatre. Determined to become an actress, Frances is equally determined not to play the Hollywood game: she refuses to acquiesce to publicity stunts, and insists upon appearing on screen without makeup. She marries her first husband, Dwayne Steele, despite being advised not to, but cheats on him with alleged Communist Harry York on the night of her hometown's premiere of Come and Get It. Her defiance attracts the attention of Broadway playwright Clifford Odets, who convinces Frances that her future rests with the Group Theatre.

After leaving Hollywood for New York City and appearing in the Group Theatre play Golden Boy, Frances learns, much to her chagrin, that the Group Theatre exploited her fame only to draw in more customers, replacing her with a wealthy actress for her family's needed financial backing for the play's London tour, and Odets ends their affair upon his wife's upcoming return from Europe. Her desperate attempts to restart her film career upon returning to Hollywood results in being cast in unchallenging roles in forgettable B-films. Her increased dependence on alcohol and amphetamines in the 1940s and the pressures brought on her by her wannabe mother, who becomes her legal guardian after her multiple legal problems, result in a complete nervous breakdown. After her first hospitalization at Kimball Sanitarium in La Crescenta where she was forced to undergo insulin shock therapy and hydrotherapy, she tells her mother that she doesn't want to return to Hollywood but instead wants to live alone in the countryside, assaulting and threatening Lillian in the resulting argument.  While institutionalized at Western State Hospital, Frances is abused by the powers that be: she is subjected to electroconvulsive shock therapy, is cruelly beaten, periodically raped by the male orderlies and visiting soldiers from a nearby military base and involuntarily lobotomized before her release in 1950.

In 1958, Frances is paid honor on Ralph Edwards' This Is Your Life television program, which Harry York watches from his home. When asked about alcoholism, illegal drugs and mental illness, Farmer denies them all and says, "If you're treated like a patient, you're apt to act like one". The film ends just after a party honoring her at the Hollywood Roosevelt Hotel with Farmer walking down a street with Harry York, talking about her parents' deaths, how she sold their house and that she's a "faceless sinner" with a slower paced lifestyle ahead of her in the future. The end credits state that she moved to Indianapolis shortly afterwards, hosting a local daytime TV program (Frances Farmer Presents) from 1958 to 1964 before dying alone, just as she had lived, on August 1, 1970 at age 56.

Cast

Production
The film was developed by the team who had made The Elephant Man, writers Eric Bergren and Christopher De Vore, and producer Jonathan Sanger and Mel Brooks. Brooks was keen for David Lynch, who had directed The Elephant Man, to direct. However, Lynch had signed an agreement with Universal. Sanger then suggested Graeme Clifford, who was well established as an editor, notably having made several films with Robert Altman. "He's very bright and completely in love with the story," said Brooks.

The script was based upon William Arnold's Shadowland, a fictional biography of Farmer. In pre-production, the producers reneged on their option to use the book as source material. Arnold filed an unsuccessful copyright infringement lawsuit but many of his fictional elements were incorporated into the final film.

On the commentary of the DVD release, director Clifford stated, "We didn't want to nickel and dime people to death with facts." Mel Brooks was executive producer of the film, but intentionally received no credit for his participation as his name had been attributed to parodies or crude comedies.

The filmmakers struggled to gain finance until EMI Films stepped in.

Casting
Many actresses were considered candidates for the role of Frances Farmer including Anne Archer, Susan Blakely, Blythe Danner, Susan Dey, Patty Duke, Mia Farrow, Sally Field, Jane Fonda, Goldie Hawn, Diane Keaton, Liza Minnelli, Susan Sarandon, Cybill Shepherd, Sissy Spacek, Meryl Streep, Natalie Wood and Tuesday Weld. Faye Dunaway turned it down.

"This is a role every actress waits all her life for," said Hawn.

Jessica Lange had wanted to play the role since reading Farmer's memoirs in the late 1970s. She tried to interest Bob Rafelson and Bob Fosse to make the film but neither was interested. Then she says Clifford called her directly offering the role. (Clifford had edited Lange in The Postman Always Rings Twice.)

"She was very high-strung and had overpowering elements in her personality of self-destruction, but she was a real warrior," said Lange. "It was misguided heroics."

"I began to identify with Frances Farmer's anger," said Lange. "She would release it no matter what the consequences were."

Susan Blakely went on to portray Farmer in the 1983 CBS television film Will There Really Be a Morning?

Music
The original music score was composed by John Barry. According to Barry, his idea of carrying the main theme using a harmonica was initially disliked by producers until they heard it fully orchestrated.
Along with some popular songs from the period, a notable piece of music was from Mozart's Piano Sonata No.11, K331, and the second movement of Beethoven's seventh Symphony also featured.

Editing
The film originally ran for three hours and was cut down. This meant reduction of the amount of screen time dedicated to Frances and her parents, and Frances and her love interest. Clifford would subsequently claim he felt the film was too short.

Reception
Frances holds a 66% rating on Rotten Tomatoes based on 29 reviews with the consensus: "This sordid biopic emphasizes the indignities visited upon Frances Farmer to the detriment of fleshing her out as a person, but Jessica Lange's towering performance invests the tragic figure with a humanity that the script lacks."

Awards and nominations

References

External links
 
 
 
 

1982 films
1980s biographical drama films
1982 independent films
American biographical drama films
American independent films
Biographical films about actors
Brooksfilms films
Films produced by Mel Brooks
Films scored by John Barry (composer)
Films about psychiatry
Films based on American novels
Films directed by Graeme Clifford
Films set in the 1930s
Films set in the 1940s
Films set in the 1950s
Universal Pictures films
EMI Films films
1982 directorial debut films
1982 drama films
Films set in Seattle
1980s English-language films
1980s American films